Janić is a surname. Notable people with the surname include:

Adrienne Janic (born 1974), American actress and TV host of Serbian origin
Mićo Janić (born 1979), Croatian sprint canoeist
Milan Janić (1957–2003), Serbian sprint canoeist
Saša Janić (born 1975), Croatian former football player
Stjepan Janić (born 1980), Croatian sprint canoeist
Vlado Janić (1904–1991), Croatian communist and partisan

See also
 Janič
 Janjić

Croatian surnames
Serbian surnames